Sunshine Marketplace (was to be called Market Towers) is a regional shopping centre in Sunshine, about  west of Melbourne, Victoria, Australia.  It has been built next to the existing Sunshine Plaza.

History
In 1994, Woolworths Limited purchased two-thirds of the former Sunshine Harvester Works site for $10 million, and submitted plans to build a $70 million shopping complex containing a Big W department store, Safeway supermarket, cinemas, and around 50 shops. Sunshine Marketplace opened in 1997 and a major redevelopment program was undertaken in 2004. The redevelopment included a new 300 seat Diners Life precinct, refurbishment of the inner and outer facades, additional stores inside and the Village Cinemas Megaplex which includes the only Intencity Gaming Complex in Melbourne's West.

On 30 January 2016 during a violent storm, the roof of the Village Cinema area began to collapse due to the heavy rain and winds.

Major anchors
Big W discount department store.
Woolworths supermarket. - 14 Aisles formerly Safeway
Village Cinemas 20 screen megaplex.
JB Hi-Fi

Transport
The 220 bus from Sunshine to Gardenvale stops in front of the shopping centre as do the 408 Highpoint to St Albans via Sunshine and the 903 SmartBus route from Altona to Mordialloc.

Gallery

References

Shopping centres in Melbourne
Shopping malls established in 1997
Sunshine, Victoria
1997 establishments in Australia
Buildings and structures in the City of Brimbank